Shannon Ann MacMillan (born October 7, 1974) is an American retired soccer player, coach, FIFA Women's World Cup champion, Olympic gold and silver medalist.  Named U.S. Soccer Athlete of the Year for 2002, MacMillan played for the United States women's national soccer team from 1994 to 2006 and was part of the 1999 FIFA Women's World Cup-winning team (commonly known as the '99ers). She won gold with the team at the 1996 Summer Olympics and silver at the 2000 Summer Olympics.

In 2007, MacMillan became an assistant coach for the UCLA Bruins women's soccer team. In 2016, she was inducted in the National Soccer Hall of Fame.

Early life
MacMillan was born in Syosset, New York. She attended San Pasqual High School in Escondido, California. She has one older brother, Sean.

University of Portland
MacMillan played for the University of Portland, where she won the Hermann Trophy for the best female collegiate soccer player of the 1995 season. She earned All-America honors from 1992 to 1995.

Playing career

Club
MacMillan was one of the founding players of the Women's United Soccer Association, playing three seasons for the San Diego Spirit.

International
While still in college, MacMillan joined the US National Team in 1993 as a midfielder. By 2000, she moved to forward.

In the Olympic semifinal against Norway in 1996, she scored the game-winning goal in overtime. In the Olympic final against China, she collected a Mia Hamm shot that rebounded off the post and put it in for the first goal of the match.

She was a "super-sub" on the US WNT's 1999 Women's World Cup team and the 2000 Olympic team. She earned a spot on the roster for the 2003 Women's World Cup team after making a miraculously quick recovery from an ACL tear suffered just four months before the tournament began.

In 2002, MacMillan scored 17 goals and was voted the U.S. Soccer Female Athlete of the Year.

She retired from international play in 2006 at the age of 31. She finished her international career with 60 goals and with 175 caps, the tenth most of any woman in history up to that time. She was the sixth-leading goal scorer in 2005.

Honors and awards
MacMillan was awarded the MAC Hermann Trophy Award in 1995.  She was voted U.S. Soccer Female Athlete of the Year in 2002. She was inducted into the Oregon Sports Hall of Fame on September 25, 2007. As a senior at Portland, she won the Honda Sports Award as the nation's top soccer player.

Coaching career
In 2007, MacMillan became an assistant coach for the UCLA women's soccer team. On January 7, 2010, she was named Director of the Competitive Program at the Del Mar Carmel Valley Sharks Soccer Club. She is currently the Executive Director of the Del Mar Carmel Valley Sharks.

She is a senior adviser to San Diego Loyal SC.

See also

 List of Olympic medalists in football
 List of 1996 Summer Olympics medal winners
 List of 2000 Summer Olympics medal winners
 History of the United States women's national soccer team

References

Further reading
 Grainey, Timothy (2012), Beyond Bend It Like Beckham: The Global Phenomenon of Women's Soccer, University of Nebraska Press, 
 Kassouf, Jeff (2011), Girls Play to Win Soccer, Norwood House Press, 
 Lisi, Clemente A. (2010), The U.S. Women's Soccer Team: An American Success Story, Scarecrow Press, 
 Longman, Jere (2009), The Girls of Summer: The U.S. Women's Soccer Team and How it Changed the World, HarperCollins, 
 Nash, Tim (2016), It's Not the Glory: The Remarkable First Thirty Years of US Women's Soccer, Lulu, 
 Rutledge, Rachel (2000), The Best of the Best in Soccer, First Avenue Edition, 
 Woolum, Janet (1998), Outstanding Women Athletes: Who They are and how They Influenced Sports in America, Greenwood Publishing Group,

External links
 
 U.S. Soccer player profile
 Shannon MacMillan's U.S. Olympic Team bio

1974 births
Living people
United States women's international soccer players
Footballers at the 1996 Summer Olympics
Footballers at the 2000 Summer Olympics
Olympic gold medalists for the United States in soccer
Olympic silver medalists for the United States in soccer
Women's United Soccer Association players
San Diego Spirit players
Washington Freedom players
Portland Pilots women's soccer players
FIFA Century Club
Soccer players from Oregon
American women's soccer players
Sportspeople from Escondido, California
People from Syosset, New York
1999 FIFA Women's World Cup players
2003 FIFA Women's World Cup players
FIFA Women's World Cup-winning players
Shiroki FC Serena players
Nadeshiko League players
Expatriate women's footballers in Japan
American expatriate women's soccer players
American expatriate sportspeople in Japan
Women's association football midfielders
Women's association football forwards
Medalists at the 2000 Summer Olympics
Medalists at the 1996 Summer Olympics
UCLA Bruins women's soccer coaches
National Soccer Hall of Fame members
Hermann Trophy women's winners
American soccer coaches